Slippery Rock University (CDP) is a census-designated place located in Slippery Rock Township, Butler County, in the U.S. state of Pennsylvania. It consists of the portion of Slippery Rock University of Pennsylvania that lies outside the borough of Slippery Rock, and the student residential population makes up the majority of the CDP's population. As of the 2010 census the population was 1,898.

References

External links

Census-designated places in Butler County, Pennsylvania
Census-designated places in Pennsylvania